Shayde Sartin (born April 1, 1976 in Williamson, West Virginia, United States) is an American musician based in San Francisco, California. He has toured the United States and Europe. He has also performed live and on recordings with multiple bands including Giant Skyflower Band, Citay, The Skygreen Leopards (Jagjaguwar and Soft Abuse Records), Wooden Wand and the Sky High Band (Kill Rock Stars) Flying Canyon (Soft Abuse Records) and with Kelley Stoltz (Sub Pop Records). While touring with Kelley Stoltz, he performed at Lollapalooza in 2006 and Motel Mozaique in 2005. He is currently in The Fresh & Onlys and Ty Segall and the Swags, both of which performed at South by Southwest Music Festival in March 2009.

Discography
The Skygreen Leopards – Disciples of California (CD, Album) 	Jagjaguwar 	2006
Flying Canyon – (CD) Soft Abuse 	2006
Wooden Wand & The Sky High Band – Second Attention (CD, Album) 	Kill Rock Stars 	2006
The Skygreen Leopards – Sing The Songs of the Lindner Brothers (CDr) 		2006
Giant Skyflower Band – Blood of the Sunworm (CD, Album) 		Soft Abuse 	2007
Papercuts – Can't Go Back (CD, Album) 		Gnomonsong 	2007
Lazarus (5) – Hawk Medicine (CD, Album) 		Temporary Residence Limited 	2007
James Jackson Toth – Waiting in Vain (CD, Album) 		Rykodisc 	2008
Kelley Stoltz – Circular Sounds (CD, Album) Sub Pop 2008
The Fresh & Onlys – Imaginary Friends EP (7" record) Chuffed records 2008
The Fresh & Onlys – The Fresh & Onlys (CD/LP) Castle Face 2009
The Fresh & Onlys' – "I'll Tell You Everything" (7" record) Dirty Knobby Industries 2009

References

External links
Dusted Magazine Castle Face LP review April 14 2009
Victim Of Time 7" review April 5th, 2009
"Nightlife: The Fresh and Onlys" San Francisco Chronicle Thursday, February 26, 2009  96hours
Culture Bully Fresh & Only's Review
SF Weekly Giant Skyflower Band Review

1976 births
Living people
People from Williamson, West Virginia
American rock musicians
Musicians from the San Francisco Bay Area
Musicians from West Virginia